Sapaywis is a former Salinan settlement in Monterey County, California. Its precise location is unknown.

References

Salinan populated places
Former Native American populated places in California
Former settlements in Monterey County, California
Lost Native American populated places in the United States